Martin Rettl (born 25 November 1973) is an Austrian skeleton racer who competed from 1989 to 2006. Competing in two Winter Olympics, he won a silver medal in the men's skeleton event at Salt Lake City in 2002.

Rettl also won a gold medal in the men's skeleton event at the 2001 FIBT World Championships in Calgary. His best overall Skeleton World Cup seasonal finish was third in the men's event in 2001–2.

Retiring from skeleton after the 2006 Winter Olympics in Turin, Martin is an air traffic controller in Innsbruck, Austria and coaches sliders from Belgium, New Zealand and Spain in the IBSF World Cup.

References
 2006 men's skeleton results
 FIBT profile
 List of men's skeleton World Cup champions since 1987.
 Men's skeleton Olympic medalists since 1928
 Men's skeleton world championship medalists since 1989
 Official website

External links
 

1973 births
Austrian male skeleton racers
Living people
Olympic skeleton racers of Austria
Skeleton racers at the 2002 Winter Olympics
Skeleton racers at the 2006 Winter Olympics
Olympic silver medalists for Austria
Olympic medalists in skeleton
Medalists at the 2002 Winter Olympics
Universiade medalists in skeleton
Universiade bronze medalists for Austria
Competitors at the 2005 Winter Universiade
20th-century Austrian people
21st-century Austrian people